Augustin Emil Hofmann von Hofmannsthal (26 January 1815 – 31 August 1881) was an Austrian industrialist.

Early life
Hofmann was born in Vienna, Austria on 26 January 1815. He was a younger son of Therese ( Schefteles) von Hofmannsthal and Isaak Löw Hofmann, Edler von Hofmannsthal. Among his siblings was Elise von Hofmannsthal (whose sister-in-law, Adelheid Herz, married Carl Mayer von Rothschild).

His father was a Jewish tobacco farmer who was made a member of the hereditary nobility, as "Edler von Hofmannsthal," by the Emperor of Austria in 1835.

Career
He was a silk breeder, factory owner, and the head of his father's subsidiary business-house in Milan. He was a recipient of the Civil Cross of Merit of Austria-Hungary.

Personal life
He converted to Catholicism and, on 5 May 1839, married Petronilla Antonia Cäcilia ( von Rhò) Ordioni (1815–1898) in Milan. The marriage was later found to be invalid due to a legal defect when it was conducted, so they married again Vienna on 8 April 1850. Petronilla, a daughter of Anton Maria von Rhò and widow of Pietro Ordioni (who died in 1835), was from an aristocratic Italian family. Together, they were the parents of:

 Hugo August Peter von Hofmannsthal (1841–1915), a director of the Boden-Credit-Anstalt who married Anna Maria Josefa Fohleutner, a daughter of Laurentz Fohleutner (whose family came to Vienna from the Sudetenland via Bavaria).
 Sylvius Silvio Arvinius Leo von Hofmannsthal (1852–1921), and engineer who married Emerica Albertina "Emma" Burián von Rajecz, a member of an ancient Hungarian noble family.
 Guido von Hofmannsthal (1854-1925), an art collector and banker with Wiener Bankverein who married Franziska "Fanny" Opatalek-Treis in Bad Ischl in 1885.

Hofmannsthal died on 31 August 1881 at Krems in Lower Austria.

Descendants
Through his son Hugo, he was a grandfather of Hugo von Hofmannsthal (1874–1929), an Austrian novelist, librettist, and dramatist, and great-grandfather of writer Raimund von Hofmannsthal (1906–1974).

Notes

References

External links
August Hofmann Edler von Hofmannsthal portrait, 1850 (at the Frankfurt Goethe Museum).

1815 births
1881 deaths
Austrian Jews
Augustin